Villepinte may refer to:

 Villepinte, Aude,  a commune in southern France
 Villepinte, Seine-Saint-Denis, a commune in the northeastern suburbs of Paris, France
 Villepinte station, on the RER B's Airport branch